Spicy is the condition of having a strong, sharp smell or flavor.

Spicy may also refer to:
 "Spicy" (Herve Pagez and Diplo song)
 "Spicy" (Ty Dolla Sign song)